The architecture of Yemen dates back to ancient times, when it was part of a tradition of South Arabian architecture. Developments continued during the Islamic period, displaying both local characteristics and external influences. The historic cities and towns of Yemen are also known for their traditional tower-houses.

Ancient Yemen 

In Antiquity, Yemen was home to several wealthy city-states and an indigenous tradition of South Arabian architecture. Historical texts and archeological evidence indicate that large and richly-decorated palaces existed in several cities, such as the Ghumdan Palace in Sanaa. Most of these structures have not been preserved, although the remains of Shabwa, the former capital of Ḥaḍramawt, provide some evidence of their structure.

In the first millennium BCE the first large South Arabian kingdom, Saba', was created by the Sabaeans with its center at Marib, alongside other kingdoms in the region. Its influence reached as far as Ethiopia. The oases of this region grew their agriculture with the help of floodwaters. Marib city and some constructions in the Wadi Dhana valley were likely established as early as the 2nd millennium BCE and artificial irrigation may date as far back as the third millennium BCE. The ancient Marib Dam was first built in the 6th century BCE and repaired up until the 5th or 6th century CE. It was a major feat of engineering in the ancient world and was used to harness the water of biannual floods, allowing for more systematic irrigation. A second dam was built towards 500 BC as a sloping rampart with a triangular cross section.

Classical Sabaean temples were structures with an inner courtyard in peristyle form (surrounded by porticoes). An example of this is the Awwam Temple or Mahram Bilqis, which was erected at the edge of a large, roughly oval, walled enclosure. In the Jawf region temples could have a hypostyle form. In both the Jawf and Hadramawt regions there were also temples consisting of an interior space divided by two rows of three or four pillars, which in Hadramawt often had bent entrances. The art of these temples is characterized by their abstractness, as exemplified by their distinctive ibex friezes. Aside from temple architecture, it also appears that the traditional Yemeni tower-house emerged around this period, built with stone foundations and upper sections in wood and clay.

In the first century BCE the Romans arrived in the Red Sea region, resulting in a shift in power and trade networks. A new Himyarite kingdom took control of Yemen. In the same century the Palace of Shaqir (the "Towering One") was built in Shabwa. It was destroyed circa 230 CE but subsequently rebuilt and restored. The building, made of mudbrick and wood on stone foundations, consisted of a towering multi-story structure attached to a courtyard surrounded by two-story galleries. The galleries had octagonal pillars covered with carved vine motifs and capitals carved with images of griffins. Well frescoes depicted scenes with women and other decorative motifs. The ornamental repertoire displays links with late Hellenistic art of the time.

As the Himyarite kingdom grew stronger it cultivated a period of peace and cultural exchanges. The capital was at Zafar (near Yarim), which was enclosed by double walls and nine gates. It had a citadel, the Raidan fortress or Raydan Palace, which was the seat of the Himyarite kings. Other stone castles were built in various locations. By the 5th century AD, there is evidence that the indigenous styles were being influenced by Byzantine and Late Antique Mediterranean art. In the 5th and 6th centuries Christianity spread in the region and churches were built. Abraha, a local Aksumite ruler who made Sanaa his capital, built a cathedral there circa 567, allegedly with the help of two architects provided by Byzantine emperor Justinian I. The Ghumdan Palace, which was probably first built around 200 CE, was preserved in collective memory and probably influenced the architecture of future palaces. It apparently had many stories, a transparent roof of alabaster, coloured stone inlay decorating its façades, and animal statues.

Islamic period 

Yemen was Islamized in the 7th century, but few buildings from the early Islamic period have been preserved intact today. It is only from the 10th century onward that distinctive Islamic architectural styles can be documented. Yemeni architecture can be characterized as "conservative", as the Yemeni people combine their pre-Islamic and Islamic past. This philosophy is demonstrated in the construction of the mosque of Solomon in Marib, which was built directly on top of an old temple.

After the early caliphal period the region was ruled by various dynasties including the Sulayhids (11th–12th centuries) and Rasulids (13th–15th centuries), among other local states. One type of mosque attested around this time consists of a large cubic chamber with one entrance, which had antecedents in the pre-Islamic temple architecture of the region. Examples include the al-Abbas Mosque in Asnaf (1126, near Sanaa) and the Mosque of Sarha (13th century, near Ibb), which both have richly-decorated ceilings carved and painted with interlacing star-like patterns. Another type consisted of a rectangular chamber, with a transverse orientation, with multiple entrances and supporting columns inside, sometimes preceded by a courtyard. Examples of this include the Mosque of Sulayman ibn Dawud (1089) at Marib and the congregational mosque of Damar (12th–13th century). This type also had pre-Islamic antecedents.

The hypostyle mosque with courtyard, which was more common throughout much of the Islamic world at the time, was comparatively rare in early Islamic Yemen. The Great Mosque of Sanaa, commissioned by the Umayyad caliph al-Walid  (r. 705–15), was one of the few mosques of this type in the region. It was reconstructed in 753–4 and again after 875. On the latter occasion it was rebuilt with stone and gypsum walls and a teak roof, though these too have been repaired and restored over the centuries. The mosque's decoration reflects the multiple restorations but also exemplifies the best artistic techniques in Yemen over the centuries, including carved and painted wood, carved stone, and carved stucco. Another example of an early hypostyle courtyard mosque in the region is the Great Mosque of Shibam (9th–10th century) and the Mosque of Arwa bint Ahmad (1087–9) in Jibla. The Great Mosque of Shibam, like the Great Mosque of Sanaa, has a richly-painted ceiling, though its columns and their capitals resemble pre-Islamic forms. The Mosque of Arwa bint Ahmad was reportedly part of a Sulayhid palace before being converted to a mosque. Unlike other local hypostyle mosques at the time, it features a dome over the space in front of its mihrab, which is likely due to Fatimid architectural influence via the Sulayhids (who acknowledged the Fatimids as caliphs). Its mihrab is also the oldest surviving well-decorated mihrab in Yemen, covered in carved arabesques and featuring a rectangular frame with a Kufic inscription. This design was imitated in later mihrabs in the region. One of the oldest surviving minarets in Yemen is the brick minaret of the Great Mosque of Zabid.

The Ayyubids introduced domed mosque types as well as Sunni-syle madrasas to the region, but none of their buildings in Yemen have survived. The Rasulids after them, however, were prolific patrons of architecture and perpetuated these new building types, influenced by their political links with Egypt. The Rasulids were based in Ta'izz and several of their buildings survive there, including the Muẓaffariyya Mosque (built by Sultan al-Malik al-Muẓaffar Yusuf sometime between 1249 and 1295) and the Ashrafiyya Mosque (built by Sultan al-Malik al-Ashraf in 1397–1401), both of which feature large central domes flanked by smaller domes. The oldest madrasas in Yemen also date from this time, including three in Ta'izz: the Asadiyya Madrasa (before 1258), the Mu'tabiyya Madrasa (1392) and the Ashrafiyya Madrasa (attached to the mosque of the same name). Unlike contemporary madrasas in Egypt, the Rasulid madrasas do not follow the four-iwan layout. The Mu'tabiyya and Ashrafiyya madrasas both have rectangular floor plans with a domed prayer hall to the north and a courtyard to the south flanked by smaller domed and vaulted chambers on either side which were used for teaching.

During the same period, the Zaydi imams in northern Yemen were buried in richly-decorated domed tombs which were among the only significant examples of this type of building in Yemen at the time, as the Rasulid rulers were normally buried in tombs attached to their madrasas. Minarets in the later Rasulid period were strongly influenced by Egyptian Mamluk minarets, with shafts divided into multiple levels with differing designs, while Zaydi minarets were generally simpler. With the advent of Ottoman rule in Yemen after 1538, Rasulid-style architecture continued to be the local norm in Sunni-controlled areas, but elements of Ottoman architecture began to be introduced in the late 16th century with the construction of new monuments such as the Bakiriyya Mosque in Sanaa in 1597.

Vernacular architecture 

Yemen is also notable for its historic tower-houses, built on two or more floors. These houses vary in form and materials from region to region. They are typically built of mud (either rammed earth or sun-dried mudbrick), stone, or a combination of both, with timber used for roofs and floors. In some cases, as at Sanaa, the lower floors are built in heavier stone and the upper floors are built in lighter brick. Mud is sometimes mixed with straw and the walls are sometimes finished with lime. Traditionally, the ground floor could be used for practical functions such as agriculture, the middle floors consisted of various multi-functional rooms, and the top floor often had a large reception room (mafraj) which also enjoyed the best views. Some villages and towns, such as Rada'a, were built around a fortified citadel (e.g. the Citadel of Rada'a), others were encircled by a high mud-brick wall (e.g. Shibam), and some were built so that the houses themselves formed an outer wall along an elevated position (e.g. Khawlan). While these structures are repaired and restored over time, this architectural style has remained generally unchanged for hundreds of years. The old city of Sanaa is a prominent example which preserves many of these houses. Today it is a UNESCO World Heritage Site, although its conservation is threatened by the ongoing Yemeni Civil War.

References

Citations

Bibliography

Further reading 

 

 
Architectural history